John Brooks may refer to:

Association football/soccer
Johnny Brooks (1931–2016), former English footballer
John Brooks (referee) (born 1990), English association football referee
John Brooks (footballer, born 1956), retired English soccer forward
John Brooks (soccer, born 1993), German-American soccer player
John Brooks (footballer, born 1927) (1927–2018), English footballer
John Brookes (footballer, born 1945), English footballer

Other sportspeople
 John Brooks (racing driver) (born 1959), American race car driver
 John Brooks (rugby union) (born 1977), Harlequins rugby union player
 John Brooks (athlete) (1910–1990), American long jumper

Politicians
 John Brooks (governor) (1752–1825), 11th Governor of Massachusetts
 John Brooks (mayor) (1785–1869), 9th mayor of Columbus, Ohio
 John Brooks (New York politician) (born 1949), Member of the New York Senate from the 8th District
 John Brooks, Baron Brooks of Tremorfa (1927–2016), Welsh politician and boxing functionary
 John Brooks (English politician) (1856–1886), British Conservative MP
 John C. Brooks (born 1937), North Carolina Labor Commissioner
 J. Stewart Brooks (1910–2000), Canadian politician whose given name was John

Musicians
 John Benson Brooks (1917–1999), American jazz pianist, songwriter, arranger, and composer
 John Ellingham Brooks (1863–1929), English pianist and classical music scholar

Others
 John Brooks (engraver) (fl. 1755), Irish engraver
 John Brooks (writer) (1920–1993), financial journalist for The New Yorker magazine
 John Brooks Jr. (1783–1813), United States Marine Lieutenant, killed at Battle of Lake Erie
 John A. Brooks (1836–1897), religious scholar and prohibitionist
 John E. Brooks (1923–2012), former President of College of the Holy Cross
 John J. Brooks, American lawman
 John Graham Brooks (1846–1938), American sociologist, political reformer, and author
 John Langdon Brooks (1920–2000), American evolutionary biologist, ecologist and limnologist
 Ferdinand Poulton (c. 1601–1641), Jesuit missionary who used the alias John Brooks for most of his life

See also 
John Brooks House, historic house in Worcester, Massachusetts
Jon Brooks (disambiguation)
Jack Brooks (disambiguation)
John Brooks Wheelwright (1897–1940), American poet
John Brooks Close (1850–1914), English banker and amateur rower
John Brooke (disambiguation)
John Brookes (disambiguation)
Brooks (surname)